Ekiga (formerly called GnomeMeeting) is a VoIP and video conferencing application for GNOME and Microsoft Windows. It is distributed as free software under the terms of the GNU GPL-2.0-or-later. It was the default VoIP client in Ubuntu until October 2009, when it was replaced by Empathy. Ekiga supports both the SIP and H.323 (based on OPAL) protocols and is fully interoperable with any other SIP compliant application and with Microsoft NetMeeting. It supports many high-quality audio and video codecs.

Ekiga was initially written by Damien Sandras in order to graduate from the University of Louvain (UCLouvain). It is currently developed by a community-based team led by Sandras. The logo was designed based on his concept by Andreas Kwiatkowski.

Ekiga.net was also a free and private SIP registrar, which enabled its members to originate and terminate (receive) calls from and to each other directly over the Internet.
The service was discontinued at the end of 2018.

Features 
Features of Ekiga include:

Integration 
Ekiga is integrated with a number of different software packages and protocols such as LDAP directories registration and browsing along with support for Novell Evolution so that contacts are shared between both programs and zeroconf (Apple Bonjour) support. It auto-detects devices including USB, ALSA and legacy OSS soundcards, Video4linux and FireWire camera.

User interface 
Ekiga supports a Contact list based interface along with Presence support with custom messages. It allows for the monitoring of contacts and viewing call history along with an addressbook, dialpad, and chat window. SIP URLs and H.323/callto support is built-in along with full-screen videoconferencing (accelerated using a graphics card).

Technical features 
 Call forwarding on busy, no answer, always (SIP and H.323)
 Call transfer (SIP and H.323)
 Call hold (SIP and H.323)
 DTMF support (SIP and H.323)
 Basic instant messaging (SIP)
 Text chat (SIP and H.323)
 Register with several registrars (SIP) and gatekeepers (H.323) simultaneously
 Ability to use an outbound proxy (SIP) or a gateway (H.323)
 Message waiting indications (SIP)
 Audio and video (SIP and H.323)
 STUN support (SIP and H.323)
 LDAP support
 Audio codec algorithms: iLBC, GSM 06.10, MS-GSM, G.711 A-law, G.711 μ-law, G.726, G.721, Speex, G.722, CELT (also G.723.1, G.728, G.729, GSM 06.10, GSM-AMR, G.722.2 [GSM‑AMR-WB] using Intel IPP)
 Video codec algorithms: H.261, H.263+, H.264, Theora, MPEG-4

History 
Ekiga was originally started over Christmas in the year 2000. Originally written by Damien Sandras it grew to being maintained by a team of nine regular contributors by 2011. Sandras wanted to create a Netmeeting clone for Linux as his graduating project at UCLouvain.

Ekiga was referred to as GnomeMeeting until 2004 when a name change was thought necessary by the developers. Concerns were cited that the original name was associated with a dead Microsoft product called NetMeeting, and not always recognized as VoIP software. It was also proposed that some people assumed they needed to run GNOME to run GnomeMeeting, which was no longer the case. Eventually on January 18, 2006 the name Ekiga was chosen based on an old way of communicating between villages in Cameroon. Around that the time the direction of the software project was changed and it turned into a SIP client.

The following shows major version releases:
 March 2004 – Version 1.0 under the name GnomeMeeting
 March 2006 – Version 2.0 was released under name Ekiga, it was bundled with GNOME 2.14
 April 2007 – Version 2.0.9 was the first version to include support for Microsoft Windows
 September 2008 – Version 3.0.0
 March 2009  - First release of the 3.2.x series.  Added support for G.722 audio as well as unified the support for H.263 and H.263.
 November 2012  - Ekiga 4.0.0, "The Victory Release", is a major release with many major improvements.
 February 2013  - Ekiga 4.0.1, "The Victory Release", this version has many improvements.
 2015; - Ekiga 5.0, new Version with GTK+ 3 and new codecs announced.

See also 

 Comparison of VoIP software
 Blink
 QuteCom
 Jitsi
List of free and open-source software packages
 Twinkle
 SFLphone
 Tox

References

External links 

 

VoIP software
Free VoIP software
Teleconferencing
Groupware
Social networking services
Online chat
Free instant messaging clients
GNOME Applications
Videotelephony
2000 software
Videoconferencing software that uses GTK
Instant messaging clients that use GTK
Voice over IP clients that use GTK
Université catholique de Louvain